Wilhelm Miklas (15 October 187220 March 1956) was an Austrian politician who served as President of Austria from 1928 until the Anschluss to Nazi Germany in 1938.

Early life
Born as the son of a post official in Krems, in the Cisleithanian crown land of Lower Austria, Miklas graduated from high school at Seitenstetten and went on to study history and geography at the University of Vienna. From 1905 to 1922, Miklas was headmaster of the Federal Secondary School in Horn, a small town in the Lower Austrian Waldviertel region.

Early political career
In 1907, Miklas was elected to the Imperial Council (Reichsrat) parliament as a member of the Christian Social Party. Re-elected in 1911, Miklas held a parliamentary seat in the provisional assembly of German-Austria and in the Constitutional Assembly of the First Austrian Republic. A rare opponent of German nationalism, he declared himself against a closer connection with the Weimar Republic and played a pivotal role in adopting the red-white-red Austrian flag.

In 1919, Miklas was appointed state secretary in the Austrian government of Chancellor Karl Renner. From 1923 to 1928, he was the speaker of the National Council (Nationalrat).

Presidency
On 10 December 1928, the representatives of the Federal Assembly elected him president, which he served until the position ceased to exist ten years later.

Miklas did not intervene, when on 4 March 1933 after a heated discussion in the Nationalrat parliament over a strike of federal railways employees Speaker Karl Renner as well as his deputies Rudolf Ramek and Sepp Straffner resigned their offices. The assembly was no longer capable for actions and decisions, which gave Miklas' party fellow Chancellor Engelbert Dollfuss the pretext to declare the parliament's "self-elimination". The government obstructed any resumption of the session by massive presence of police forces as well as of paramilitary Heimwehr troops led by Emil Fey, a self-coup that enabled Dollfuss to rule by "emergency decrees" following the Article 48 example set by German President Paul von Hindenburg.

The president remained passive on 20 May, when the government established the Fatherland's Front as a prospective single-party, followed by the ban of the Communist Party, the Austrian branch of the Nazi Party and the Social Democratic Republikanischer Schutzbund paramilitary organisation. The prohibition of the Arbeiter-Zeitung (Worker's Newspaper) and the measures against the Austrian labour movement led to the outbreak of the Austrian Civil War on 12 February 1934. As a result, also the Social Democratic Party was banned and the Austrofascist ideology finally realized with the implementation of the Federal State of Austria (Ständestaat). The authoritarian measures had no effect on the office of the President. In his private records, Miklas clearly condemned the violation of the constitution by Dollfuss and his successor Kurt Schuschnigg, but he did not openly criticise the government's policies.

Miklas was highly unpopular among Austrian Nazis, as he refused to commute the death sentences imposed on assassins of  Dollfuss after the failed July Putsch in 1934. In view of the rising pressure by Nazi Germany, the Austrofascist state approached the Kingdom of Italy under Duce Benito Mussolini and the Kingdom of Hungary. In 1936, Miklas entertained Regent Miklós Horthy at Wörthersee.

After Schuschnigg on 12 February 1938 had been summoned to the Berghof by Adolf Hitler to receive German demands, Miklas offered amnesty to the jailed Nazi members but initially refused to turn over the national police force to their leader Arthur Seyss-Inquart. However, when Hitler ordered Wehrmacht operations along the border, the president was forced to give in and installed Seyss-Inquart as Austrian Minister of the Interior.

On 9 March 1938, Schuschnigg announced a plebiscite on Austrian independence to be held within four days. In turn, on 11 March Hermann Göring demanded that Seyss-Inquart replace Schuschnigg as chancellor; otherwise, German forces would overrun Austria the following day. While a Nazi mob invaded the chancellery, Schuschnigg declared his resignation ("yielding to force"). Miklas again refused to appoint Seyss-Inquart but was not able to present a non-Nazi candidate. After Hitler received the confirmation from Mussolini that Italy would not interfere, he gave orders that German troops would invade at dawn the following day (Unternehmen Otto). Miklas capitulated at midnight, announcing that he had instated Seyss-Inquart as new chancellor. Seyss-Inquart hectically spoke on the phone with the Nazi authorities in Berlin, but it was too late. When German troops rolled over the border at dawn the next day, they met with no resistance by the Austrian Armed Forces and were largely greeted as heroes.

Miklas, for his initial refusal, ended up under house arrest but was protected from mistreatment by the future Waffen-SS Colonel Otto Skorzeny during the days of the Anschluss. With the promulgation of a "law concerning the re-unification of Austria with the German Reich" by Seyss-Inquart on 13 March, the offices of both the Austrian chancellor and of the Austrian president were terminated. While Schuschnigg was imprisoned, Miklas abandoned the political sphere and retired, receiving his pension unmolested.

After World War II
After World War II, Miklas refused to run again for presidency, in favour of Karl Renner.

He died on 20 March 1956 in Vienna.

Notes

External links
 

1872 births
1956 deaths
People from Krems an der Donau
Austrian Roman Catholics
Christian Social Party (Austria) politicians
Fatherland Front politicians
Presidents of Austria
Members of the Austrian House of Deputies (1907–1911)
Members of the Austrian House of Deputies (1911–1918)
Members of the Provisional National Assembly
Members of the Constituent National Assembly (Austria)
Presidents of the National Council (Austria)
Burials at Döbling Cemetery